Portland Estates is a suburban neighbourhood in Woodlawn, an area of eastern Dartmouth in the Halifax Regional Municipality, Nova Scotia. It reaches from Eisener Blvd. in the west, all the way to Portland Hills in the east, and is located to the south of Portland Street (Route 207).

Geography

Transportation
Portland Estates is served by Metro Transit - Bus #57. One of the municipality's new bus rapid transit routes has a terminus in Portland Hills.

Shopping
Adjacent to Portland Estates
Atlantic Superstore

Within a couple kilometres
Woodlawn Shopping Centre
Penhorn Plaza

Schools
Elementary (grades primary to 6) - Portland Estates Elementary School
Junior High (grades 7-9) -- Ellenvale Junior High School
High Schools (grades 10-12)
English, with optional International Baccalaureate (IB) Diploma program - Prince Andrew High School
French Immersion - Dartmouth High School 
French Immersion International Baccalaureate - Cole Harbour District High School

Postal Code
B2W ...

History
1980's - Portland Estates opens
2000 - Portland Estates Elementary School opens
2001-2008 - Portland Hills opens
2006-2008+ - Russell Lake and Russell Lake West opens

References

Communities in Halifax, Nova Scotia
Dartmouth, Nova Scotia